Events of 2013 in Spain

Incumbents 
 Monarch - Juan Carlos I
 Prime Minister - Mariano Rajoy

Events

January 

 30 January - The Spanish newspaper El País publishes accounting information - which will be known as Bárcenas affair - revealing the alleged payment of bonuses to the Spanish People's Party leaders from undeclared contributions from businesses.

July
8 July - Nine people have died and 21 were injured after a bus careered off the road near the central town of Avila.
24 July - The Santiago de Compostela derailment kills 77.

September
 Miss Universe Spain 2013

October
28 October - A gas leak at a coal mine has killed six people and left five injured.

Births in 2013

 January 22 -  Milan Piqué, son of Shakira & Gerard Piqué

Deaths in 2013

 January 8 - Manuel Mota, 46, Spanish fashion designer, suicide. 
 January 6 
 Jon Ander López, 36, Spanish footballer, heart attack.
 Enrique Meneses, 83, Spanish photographer.
 March 28 - Manuel García Ferré, 83,  cartoonist, complications of heart surgery.
 April 2 - Jesús Franco, 82, filmmaker.
 October 11 - María de Villota, 33, racing driver.

See also
2013 in Spanish television
List of Spanish films of 2013

References